Peter Whitney (born Peter King Engle; May 24, 1916 – March 30, 1972) was an American actor in film and television. Tall and heavyset, he played brutish villains in many Hollywood films in the 1940s and 1950s.

Early years 
Whitney was born in Long Branch, New Jersey, but grew up in California. His schools included the Royal Central School of Speech and Drama in London. He studied drama at the Pasadena Playhouse.

Career
Whitney was often a supporting character actor credited at least in the top ten actors appearing in several Hollywood classic feature films, such as  Destination Tokyo (1943), Action in the North Atlantic (1943), Mr. Skeffington (1944), Murder, He Says (1945) (in which he played a dual role), The Big Heat (1953), In the Heat of the Night (1967), The Ballad of Cable Hogue (1970), and others before becoming well known for his work in television.

In the 1958–1959 season, Whitney had a co-starring role as Buck Sinclair, a former sergeant of the Union Army, in all 39 episodes of the ABC western series The Rough Riders. He also guest-starred on the ABC/Warner Brothers western series Colt .45. He performed the part of Ralph in the 1958 episode "Mantrap". He played United States Secret Service agent Gunnerson in the episode "Savage Hills," and Brock in "Dodge City or Bust" on the ABC/WB series, Maverick. In 1960, in the episode "Surface of Truth" of another ABC/WB western series, Lawman, Whitney played Lucas Beyer, a crude white man who has lived for ten years with the Cheyenne Indians.

Whitney made three guest appearances on the CBS courtroom drama series Perry Mason:  in 1961 he performed as the character Roger Gates in "The Case of the Pathetic Patient"; in 1962, as prison escapee Stefan "Big Steve" Jahnchek in "The Case of the Stand-in Sister"; and in 1965, as Captain Otto Varnum in "The Case of the Wrongful Writ."

Whitney also appeared on such series as The Public Defender, Gunsmoke, Adventures of Superman, City Detective, Fury, My Friend Flicka ("A Case of Honor"), The Californians, Sheriff of Cochise, Behind Closed Doors, Northwest Passage, Tate, Tombstone Territory (episode "Apache Vendetta"), Johnny Ringo, The Virginian (The Runaway – 1969), Riverboat,Bourbon Street Beat, The Alaskans, Overland Trail (as Governor Sutcliff in episode "First Stage to Denver"), The Rebel, The Islanders, Adventures in Paradise, Straightaway, Wagon Train, The Untouchables, Bonanza, The Rifleman, The Monkees, Petticoat Junction (as Jasper Tweedy, in the 1969 episode: "Sorry Doctor, I Ain't Taking No Shots"), Green Acres, The Beverly Hillbillies, Rawhide (episode "Incident of the Music Maker"), Peter Gunn (as Josiah in the episode “The Best Laid Plans“, and Hawaii Five-O.  In addition, Whitney played a French partisan fighter named Massine in the 1963 episode "Thunder from the Hill" of ABC's military drama Combat!, as well as the character Caleb Calhoun in a 1964 episode of the Daniel Boone series.  Then, in 1965, Whitney was cast as Judge Roy Bean in the episode "A Picture of a Lady" on the syndicated television series Death Valley Days.He also did well as a comedy actor, making four appearances on "The Beverly Hillbillies" as the oafish Lafayette "Lafe" Crick.

Peter Whitney's final role on television was that of a grave robber in writer Rod Serling's series Night Gallery, in a 1972 episode segment titled "Deliveries in the Rear".

Death
Whitney died of a heart attack at the age of 55 in Santa Barbara, California. He was buried at Pierce Brothers Valley Oaks Memorial Park in Westlake Village, California.

Partial filmography

 Underground (1941) – Alex
 Nine Lives Are Not Enough (1941) – Roy
 Blues in the Night (1941) – Pete Bossett
 Valley of the Sun (1942) – Willie
 Rio Rita (1942) – Jake
 Spy Ship (1942) – Zinner
 Busses Roar (1942) – Frederick Hoff
 Reunion in France (1942) – Soldier
 Whistling in Dixie (1942) – Frank V. Bailie
 Action in the North Atlantic (1943) – Whitey Lara
 Destination Tokyo (1943) – Dakota
 Mr. Skeffington (1944) – Chester Forbish
 Bring on the Girls (1945) – Swede
 Hotel Berlin (1945) – Heinrichs
 Murder, He Says (1945) – Mert Fleagle / Bert Fleagle
 Three Strangers (1946) – Timothy Delaney aka Gabby
 The Notorious Lone Wolf (1946) – Harvey Beaumont
 Blonde Alibi (1946) – Police Lt. Melody Haynes
 Canyon Passage (1946) – Cornelius – Baggage Clerk (uncredited)
 The Brute Man (1946) – Police Lieutenant Gates
 Violence (1947) – Joker Robinson
 Northwest Outpost (1947) – Volkoff Overseer
 The Gangster (1947) – Karty's Brother-in-Law (uncredited)
 The Iron Curtain (1948) – Cipher Lt. Vinikov (uncredited)
 Big Jim McLain (1952) – Communist Truck Driver (uncredited)
 The Great Sioux Uprising (1953) – Ahab Jones
 The Big Heat (1953) – Tierney
 All the Brothers Were Valiant (1953) – James Finch, First Mate
 Gorilla at Large (1954) – Kovacs
 The Black Dakotas (1954) – Grimes
 Day of Triumph (1954) – Nikator
 The Sea Chase (1955) – Bachman
 The Last Frontier (1955) – Sergeant Major Decker
 Cheyenne (1955–1962, TV Series) – Lionel Abbot / Eli Henderson / Hugo Parma / Sam Magruder 
 Gunsmoke (1955–1965, TV Series) – Jason Holt / Dan Braden / Gip Cooley / Ira / Big Dan Daggit / Jase Murdock
 Great Day in the Morning (1956) – Phil the Cannibal (uncredited)
 The Cruel Tower (1956) – 'Joss' Jossman
 Man from Del Rio (1956) – Ed Bannister
 Tombstone Territory (1957) – Karl Rank
 Domino Kid (1957) – Lafe Prentiss
 The Walter Winchell File (1957, Episode: "Where is Louis Melk?") – Rocco Ricardi
 Zane Grey Theatre (1957–1961, TV Series) – Moose / Cox – Saloonkeeper / Growler / Chub
 Rough Riders (1958–59, TV Series) Sgt. Buck Sinclair
 Have Gun - Will Travel (1958–1960, TV Series) – Major Proctor / Judd Calhoun
 Official Detective (1958, Episode: "Missing") – Swanson
 Buchanan Rides Alone (1958) – Amos Agry
 Wagon Train (1958–1965, TV Series) – Buster Blee / Sheriff Pincus / Judd / Kempton / Sgt. Pat Galloway / El Landron / Rodney Miller
 The Rifleman (1959–1963, TV Series) – Nebeneezer Jackman / Vantine / Neb Jackman / John Holliver / Vince Fergus / Ott Droshek / Andrew Bechtel / John Jupiter / Tracey Blanch
 Rawhide (1960, TV Series) – Anton Zwahlen (A Swiss gunsmith sabotages the drovers' weapons in an ingenious attempt to rustle part of the herd. Kessle: Peter Whitney (not Werner Klemperer) Maria: Lili Kardell. Favor: Eric Fleming. Rowdy: Clint Eastwood.)
 Death Valley Days (1961–1966, TV Series) – Captain Joe Fuller / Judge Roy Bean / Peter the Hunter / Nat Halper / Joe Meekes
 Perry Mason (1961–1965, TV Series) – Roger Gates / Stefan "Big Steve" Jahnchek  / Captain Otto Varnum
 Straightaway (1961) – Sam Cook (episode "The Heist")
 The Wonderful World of the Brothers Grimm (1962) – The Giant (uncredited)
 The Beverly Hillbillies (1964, TV Series) – Lafayette 'Lafe' Crick
 The Virginian (1964–1969, TV Series) – McPherson / Ansel Miller / Jake Landers / Lars Holstrom
 The Sword of Ali Baba (1965) – Abou
 In the Heat of the Night (1967) – Courtney
 Chubasco (1968) – Matt
 The Great Bank Robbery (1969) – Brother Jordan Cass – Tunneling
 The Ballad of Cable Hogue (1970) – Cushing
 Night Gallery (1972, TV Series) – First Grave Robber (segment "Deliveries in the Rear")
 Tales of Wells Fargo (1961, TV Series S5E29) Moose
 Combat'' (1963 Season 2,Thunder from the Hill, TV Series) Massine

References

External links

1916 births
1972 deaths
20th-century American male actors
American male film actors
American male television actors
Burials at Valley Oaks Memorial Park
Male Western (genre) film actors
Male actors from Los Angeles
People from Long Branch, New Jersey
Western (genre) television actors